The 1980 NBA All-Star Game was an exhibition basketball game which was played at the Capital Centre in Landover, Maryland, on February 3, 1980.

MVP: George Gervin

Coaches: East: Billy Cunningham, West: Lenny Wilkens.

Television: CBS

Announcers: Brent Musburger, Bill Russell, Rod Hundley

Team rosters

Western Conference

Eastern Conference

Score by periods
 

Officials: Joe Gushue and Ed T. Rush
Attendance: 19,035.

Trivia 
With 1:40 left in the overtime period, Larry Bird made the first 3-pointer in All-Star Game history.

References 

National Basketball Association All-Star Game
All-Star